Ethynylestrenol, or ethinylestrenol, may refer to:

 Cingestol (17α-ethynyl-5-estren-17β-ol)
 Lynestrenol (17α-ethynyl-4-estren-17β-ol)
 Tigestol (17α-ethynyl-5(10)-estren-17β-ol)